Isa Silveira Leal, (20 February 1910 – 5 April 1988) also known as Isa Leal, was a Brazilian writer, poet, journalist and novelist (for radio and television). She won the Jabuti Awards on three occasions and the best poetry book prize from the São Paulo Association of Art Critics.

Career 
Isa Leal began her career as a book translator and translated texts by William Shakespeare, Pearl S. Buck and André Gide. She worked as journalist for over 20 years at Folha de São Paulo.

In 1948, Leal started working at Difusora Radio Station, as a producer. She wrote her first novel in 1956, with the title "A rainha do rádio". 

She won the Jabuti Awards on three occasions: In 1959 with "Glorinha", in 1962 with "O único amor de Ana Maria" and in 1969 with "O menino de Palmares". The book "O pescador vai ao mar" won the best poetry book prize in 1987 from the São Paulo Association of Art Critics.

Personal life 
Isa Leal was born in Santos, São Paulo on 20 February 1910. She was the only daughter of the couple of writers Valdomiro Silveira and Maria Isabel Silveira. 

Leal was married to the well-known physician and writer Alberto Leal.

Works 

Selected works include:

 A rainha do rádio (The Queen of the radio) – 1956
 Glorinha – 1958
 O menino de Palmares (The boy from Palmares) – 1971
 O único amor de Ana Maria (The only love of Ana Maria) – 1961
 Glorinha e a quermesse (Glorinha and the kirmess) – 1972
 Glorinha e o Mar (Glorinha and the ocean) – 1973
 Elas liam romances policiais (They read detective novels) – 1973
 Sem cachimbo nem boné (Without a pipe or cap) – 1977
 Mistério na morada do sol (Mystery at the Sun's Abode) – 1982
 O Barco e a Estrela (The boat and the star) – 1983

References 

1910 births
1988 deaths
Brazilian people of Portuguese descent
20th-century Brazilian novelists
Brazilian translators

Brazilian poets